Placidium arboreum, commonly known as the tree stipplescale, is a species of corticolous (bark-dwelling), squamulose (scaley) lichen in the family Verrucariaceae. It has a primarily North American distribution, with a range extending from eastern Canada south to Mexico, although it has also been reported from the West Indies and from Argentina.

Taxonomy
The lichen was first mentioned in the scientific literature as Endocarpon arboreum in an 1831 publication of Elias Fries, who attributed authorship to Lewis David de Schweinitz. Fries wrote of the lichen: "In addition there is a variety, Endocarpon arboreum of Schweinitz from North America, which by its description should be referred here but from its whole structure seems to be a poorly developed Sticta". Fries does not seem to have accepted it as a valid species. Further, because no description or diagnosis of the taxon was provided (i.e., as a nomen nudum), the name was not validly published according to nomenclatural rules. American botanist Ezra Michener published the taxon validly when he included a brief description of the species in William Darlington's 1853 work Flora Cestrica. Bruce Fink proposed a transfer to the genus Dermatocarpon in 1910. The taxon acquired its current generic placement when James Lendemer transferred it to Placidium in 2004.

According to Lendemer, some later authors have used the specific epithet tuckermanii for this species (Endocarpon tuckermanii  was validly published by Camille Montagne in 1856). This was because in 1956, Mason Hale designated the name Endocarpon arboreum as a nomen nudum, which opened the way to use the epithet tuckermanii; he was apparently not aware of Michener's publication. Since Michener's description of the species was published earlier than Montagne's, it has priority, and those names (and later recombinations) with epithet tuckermanii are relegated to synonymy.

A common name used for this lichen is "tree stipplescale".

Description

These are relatively large squamules. In a field guide to lichens of Great Smoky Mountains National Park, the authors note that this feature makes the species easy to identify because "there are very few other species that are characteristically squamulose and have squamules as large as this species. Owing to this, it is very unlikely to be confused for anything else in this part of the world". The lichen is normally brown, but becomes bright green when wet. Dark brown, dot-like perithecia are scattered on the thallus surface. The underside of the thallus is paler in colour, with tufts of hyphae that attach to the substrata. All of the standard chemical spot tests are negative. The ascospores made by the lichen are ellipsoid in shape, with dimensions of 10–15 by 4–6 μm.

Habitat and distribution
Placidium arboreum is widely distributed in the southeastern United States, with a few scattered occurrences in the western and northeastern United States. It is rare in California, with some reports from locations in the Coast Range. The North American range of the lichen extends south to Mexico. In 2017, it was recorded for the first time in Canada after it was found in a few locations in Ontario.

The lichen typically grows at the base of hardwood trees, and the bark of oak is a preferred substratum. Placidium arboreum has been recorded on several oak species: Quercus alba (white oak) is a predominant associate in the northern part of its range, Q. stellata (post oak) and Q. muehlenbergii (chinkapin) occur further south, while Q. virginiana (southern live oak), Q. arizonica (Arizona white oak), and Q. douglasii (blue oak) are associated with the lichen in the south and southwest parts of its range. Tree genera that associate with Placidium arboreum less commonly include Ulmus (elm), Fraxinus (ash), Carya (hickory), Platanus, Liquidambar (sweetgum), Acer (maple), and Salix (willow). The lichen generally establishes itself in the crevices of the bark. In rare instances, it has been recorded growing over mosses on limestone.

References

Verrucariales
Lichen species
Lichens described in 1853
Lichens of Argentina
Lichens of Eastern Canada
Lichens of the United States
Lichens of Mexico